The elm cultivar Ulmus 'Nigrescens' was identified by Pynaert  as Ulmus campestris betulaefolia nigrescens. Considered by Green  to be "probably Ulmus carpinifolia (: minor), but said to have been raised from seed of Purpurea".

Description
The tree was described as having leaves like those of the Birch, and with a darker and more persistent hue than the Wych Elm cultivar 'Purpurea'.

Cultivation
No specimens are known to survive.

Synonymy
NB. Nigricans: Bailey & Bailey, Hortus 625, 1930, as U. (americana) nigricans, name in synonymy for U. americana f. nigrescens, not U. campestris betulifoliae nigrescens Pynaert.

References

Ulmus articles missing images
Ulmus
Missing elm cultivars